Countess Debonnaire Jane von Bismarck-Schönhausen (née Patterson; born 19 August 1959) is an English businesswoman, stylist, and socialite.

Personal life 
Bismarck was born Debonnaire Jane Patterson on 19 August 1959 as the first child of Major William Garry Patterson, a military officer, and The Honourable Sandra Debonnaire Monson, a daughter of John Roseberry Monson, 10th Baron Monson. Her maternal uncle was John Monson, 11th Baron Monson.

In 1977 Bismarck was featured on the cover of, and profiled in, The Daily Telegraph's Sunday Magazine, which covered her debut into society.

In 1984 she married Count Leopold von Bismarck-Schönhausen, the youngest son of Otto Christian Archibald, Prince of Bismarck and Ann-Mari Tengbom. They have four sons: Nikolai, Tassilo, Caspar, and Carl. He son Nikolai has been in a long-term relationship with Kate Moss.

Career 
Bismarck founded the company Debonnaire, which she runs out of a boutique in Knightsbridge, London. Her company sells vintage and internationally collected women's clothing and accessories. In 2014, after a trip to India, she began producing cotton shirts and boxer shorts, and later opened a Debonnaire showroom.

References 

Living people
1959 births
Bismarck family
English socialites
English women in business
German countesses
Businesspeople in fashion
British debutantes
British women company founders